Spring Baking Championship is an American cooking competition television series that airs on Food Network. It was originally presented by chef Bobby Deen; with fellow Food Network chefs Nancy Fuller, Duff Goldman and Lorraine Pascale serving as judges. All four chefs also appeared in the same roles on Holiday Baking Championship; and similar to that competition, the grand prize for the winner of this competition is also $50,000.

The first season of Spring Baking Championship premiered on April 25, 2015. The second season of the series premiered on April 10, 2016, and concluded on May 15, 2016. The third season premiered on March 12, 2017, with Jesse Palmer replacing Deen as host. The fourth season premiered on March 12, 2018, with Ali Khan replacing Palmer as host. The fifth season premiered on March 18, 2019, with Clinton Kelly replacing Khan as host. The series was renewed for a sixth season premiering on March 9, 2020. The seventh season of the show premiered on February 22, 2021, with Khan returning as host and Kardea Brown replacing Pascale at the judges' table. Molly Yeh took over as host for the eighth season, premiering February 28, 2022. Jesse Palmer returned to host for the ninth season premiering March 6, 2023.

Format

The series format includes two rounds in each episode. The first round is the "PreHeat" where the contestants must bake something centered around a specific theme. The winner of  the first round gets an advantage going into the next round.

The second round is the "Main Heat" where the contestants create a larger confection that often follows along the same vein as the pre-heat theme. Partway through the main heat, a twist is revealed that the bakers must incorporate into their final product. The winner of the "Main Heat" advances to the next episode while the baker with the worst dish is eliminated. The three bakers remaining will compete in the final "Main Heat" challenge.

Episodes

References

External links
 
 

 
2010s American reality television series
2015 American television series debuts
American television spin-offs
English-language television shows
Reality television spin-offs
Television series by Levity Live
Food Network original programming